Harrellsville Historic District is a national historic district located at Harrellsville, Hertford County, North Carolina.  The district encompasses 69 contributing buildings, 12 contributing sites, and 4 contributing structures in the village of Harrellsville. The buildings include notable examples of Greek Revival, Queen Anne, and Bungalow / American Craftsman architecture built between about 1827 and 1945. Notable contributing resources include the Sharp Family Cemetery, Abner Harrell House (c. 1811), J.L. Smith House (1910-1915), Taylor Warehouse (1900), Work Projects Administration built School Gymnasium (1935) and Harrellsville School Auditorium (1940), John Bembury Sharp House (1833), and R.C. Mason & Son Store (1905).

It was listed on the National Register of Historic Places in 1995.

References

Historic districts on the National Register of Historic Places in North Carolina
Greek Revival architecture in North Carolina
Queen Anne architecture in North Carolina
Buildings and structures in Hertford County, North Carolina
National Register of Historic Places in Hertford County, North Carolina